This article is a list of events in the year 2006 in Chad.

Incumbents 

 President: Idriss Déby
 Prime Minister: Pascal Yoadimnadji

Events

January 

 January 27 - More than 2,000 total refugees flee from the Central African Republic into Chad's southern border, fleeing factional violence in their home country.

April 

 April 12 - The Chadian government sends soldiers to the capital, N'Djamena to secure it against the incoming threat of rebels.

 April 14 - Peace Corps temporarily suspends their participation in Chad under worry of safety of volunteers within the country due to instability and rebel fighting.
 April 18 - UN Secretary General Kofi Annan warns that violence from Chad could spread to neighboring Central African countries.

August 

 August 26 - President Déby forces oil companies Chevron and Petronas out of the country, citing that neither company had not paid taxes to the country.

September 

 September 4 - Mike Fay of National Geographic uncovers that poachers had killed 100 dead elephants near a preserve in Northern Chad.

References 

 
2000s in Chad
Years of the 21st century in Chad
Chad
Chad